Polimer TV  (also known as Polimer)  is an Indian Tamil language entertainment channel that was owned by Polimer TV Network. The channel shows dubbed series from other television channels and some original shows. It was earlier launched as a local Television channel by starting their headquarters at Salem and it aired only at Salem, Namakkal, Erode, Coimbatore, Madurai, Dharmapuri. However, It was later converted into a Tamil Entertainment channel by expanding the whole coverage in Tamilnadu by moving their headquarters at Chennai.

Current shows
Engal Sai

Former shows

Original series 
Yamini B.A.B.L.
Aayiram Jenmangal
Rajamannar Vagaiyara
Ithu Namma Veedu

Original reality/non-scripted programming 
Makkalukkaga
Polimer Junior Super Dancer
Something Something with Stars

Dubbed soap operas
24 Season 1
Alaadin (150 Episodes)
Vidhi
Aval Oru Thodarkadhai
Devi
Ennarguil Nee Irundhal
En Kanmani
En Kanmani 2 (270 Episodes)
En Vazhkai En Kaiyil (175 Episodes)
Inai Kodugal
Ini Ellam Vasanthamey
Iru Malargal (326 Episodes)
Karnan - Suriyaputhiran
Karuppu Vettai
Kalyana Kanavugal (327 Episodes) 
Madhubala - Konjam Ishtam Konjam Kastam 
Magalir Mattum (150 Episodes)
Mahaveer Hanuman
Mouna Ragam
Malgudi Days
Maaya
Mayakkam Enna
Moondru Mudichu (Longest Running Dubbed serial aired on 30 January 2012 - 29 January 2020 ending "2086" Episodes)
Nee Varuvai Ena
Nenjam Pesuthey
Nimirindhu Nil
Ninaithale InikkumPavithra (150 Episodes)Priyamudan NaaginiPudhu Pudhu ArthangalSaavalSaami Potta MudichuSakthi Pola YarumillaShakti (274 Episodes) Sree Rama Bhaktha Hanuman (52 Episodes) SundarakandamThillu Mullu (225 Episodes)Ullam Kollai PoguthadaUllam Kollai Poguthada 2 (99 Episodes)Uravae UyiraeVaa Arugil VaaKadhal ParisuChanakya Sabadham (140 Episodes)Karthika Deepam Reality/non-scripted programming India's Got Talent''

References

External links
 Official Website 

Television stations in Chennai
Tamil-language television channels
Television channels and stations established in 2009
2009 establishments in Tamil Nadu